Marcos Antônio de Araújo, Baron and Viscount of Itajubá (Diamantina, April 25, 1805 — Wiesbaden, February 6, 1884) was a Brazilian lawyer, professor, nobleman and diplomat.  He was a commander of the Imperial Order of Christ; a knight grand cross of the Order of the Red Eagle and the Order of the Dannebrog; a knight of the Order of the Immaculate Conception of Vila Viçosa and a member of His Imperial Majesty's Council (Emperor Dom Pedro II).

He married Maria Cristina Josefina Adele Vaugbelle, from his marriage with Maria Cristina he had three children, including Marcos Antônio de Araújo e Abreu, 2° Baron of Itajubá.  His second wife was Ida von Hildebrandt.

He graduated from the Law School of Olinda, where he was a professor.  He was called to the diplomat career, being the Brazilian ambassador to the States of the German Confederation, he also server in other European countries.

He was given the title of Baron on June 6, 1867; and Viscount on July 17, 1871.  Both titles were given by Emperor Dom Pedro II of Brazil.

References

Brazilian diplomats
19th-century Brazilian lawyers
Brazilian nobility
1805 births
1884 deaths